Fourmile Creek is a tributary stream of the Des Moines River that flows through Polk, Story and Boone counties, in the U.S. state of Iowa.

See also
List of rivers of Iowa

References

Rivers of Boone County, Iowa
Rivers of Polk County, Iowa
Rivers of Story County, Iowa
Rivers of Iowa